Kan du vissla Johanna? ("Can You Whistle Johanna?") is a Swedish TV film which originally aired over Sveriges Television on 24 December 1994, based on the screenwriter Ulf Stark's 1992 book with the same name. Since 1994 it has been broadcast at Christmas.

The title comes from a 1932 song with the same name by Åke Söderblom and Sten Axelson.

Plot
The film takes place during the 1950s. Berra, a 7-year-old boy, wishes for a grandfather who he can love, who can invite him for coffee and who can teach him how to whistle. His friend Ulf tells him that he can look at the retirement home, where he finds an old man called Nils who becomes Berra's stepgrandfather.

Cast
Tobias Swärd as Berra (Bertil)
Jimmy Sandin as Ulf
Per Oscarsson as Nils
Helena Kallenbäck as Tora, woman working at the retirement home
Thomas Roos as Mr Gustavsson
Gunilla Abrahamsson as teacher
Gustav Levin as Priest
Mats Bergman as Tobacco merchant

References

External links
 at SVT Play 

1994 television films
1994 films
Swedish television films
Films set in the 1950s
Films based on Swedish novels
1990s Swedish films